Tsolak Ananikyan (born 25 November 1987) is an Armenian amateur boxer.

Ananikyan won a silver medal at the 2008 European Amateur Boxing Championships in the heavyweight division.

References

External links
www.aiba.org

1987 births
Living people
Heavyweight boxers
Armenian male boxers